PLCE may refer to:

 Personal Load Carrying Equipment, the current tactical webbing system of the British Armed Forces
 PLCE1, an enzyme